Cappello is an Italian surname. Notable people with the surname include:

Antonio Cappello (1494–1565), Venetian noble
Bernardo Cappello (1498–1565), Venetian Renaissance humanist
Bianca Cappello (1548–1587), Italian noblewoman
Dominic Cappello, American writer
Gerolamo Cappello (died 1643), Italian Roman Catholic bishop
Gino Cappello (1920–1990), Italian footballer
Girolamo Cappello (born 1538), Venetian ambassador
Guido Cappello (1933–1996), Italian chess master
Frank Cappello, American screenwriter
Mary Cappello, American academic
Pierluigi Cappello (1967–2017), Italian poet
Tim Cappello, American musician
Vettore Cappello (1400–1467), Venetian statesman and military commander

See also
Capello

Italian-language surnames